Nghệ An is a province in the North Central Coast region of Vietnam. It is Vietnam's largest province by area. Nghệ An is located in a central position in North Central Coast.  To the east lies the Gulf of Tonkin; to the west the province is bordered by Laos; to the south Hà Tĩnh province; and to the north is Thanh Hóa province.  It is located on the east–west economic corridor connecting Myanmar, Thailand, Laos and Vietnam along National Route 7 to the port of Cửa Lò.

Nghệ An has one city, three towns and 17 districts. Vinh is a grade one city, and is the economic and cultural center of the province, and of the whole North Central Coast.

History
Nghệ An and Thanh Hoá were the bases of the former Lê dynasty against the Mạc dynasty in the 1530s.

Administrative divisions
Nghệ An is subdivided into 21 district-level sub-divisions:
 1 provincial city: Vinh (capital)
 3 district-level towns: Cửa Lò, Thái Hòa, Hoàng Mai
 17 districts: Anh Sơn, Con Cuông, Diễn Châu, Đô Lương, Hưng Nguyên, Kỳ Sơn, Nam Đàn, Nghi Lộc, Nghĩa Đàn, Quế Phong, Quỳ Châu, Quỳ Hợp, Quỳnh Lưu, Tân Kỳ, Thanh Chương, Tương Dương, Yên Thành

They are further subdivided into 17 commune-level towns (or townlets), 431 communes, and 32 wards.

Natural resources

Nghệ An has a total forest land area of 972,910.52 ha. Of which, production forest is 501,634.85 hectares, protection forest is 302,068.47 hectares, special-use forest is 169,207.2 hectares. With a total reserve of about 50 million cubic meters, over 1,000 million of bamboo trees are a significant source of raw materials for forestry exploitation and the development of forest-based industries.
Nghệ An has 82 km long coastline with an area of 4,230 nautical miles per square foot, along the coast has 6 creeks, over 3,000 ha of saltwater and brackish water, and 12,000 ha of freshwater and brackish water surface. Aquaculture development and processing.
Nghệ An has a large reserve of some minerals, especially minerals used for the production of construction materials such as limestone for cement production of nearly 4 billion tons; White limestone over 900 million tons; Clay for cement materials is over 1.2 billion tons; Clay for high-grade ceramics 5 million m3; Construction stone of 500 million m3; Basalt rock 260 million m3; Paving stones: Granite: 150 million m3, Marble 300 million m3, etc.

Infrastructure

Nghệ An has six national highways running through the province (NH 1A, NH 15, NH Ho Chi Minh, NH7, NH46, NH48). There is a trans-Asia route from Laos through the Thanh Thuy border gate to Cửa Lò and Dong Hoi port, along with provincial and district roads to create an interconnected network linking districts and economic zones. Cửa Lò port has a capacity of 3 million tons per year, and is capable of accommodating 10,000 DWT vessels. Currently, a deep-water port has been planned and is being built to accommodate ships of 50,000 DWT–100,000 DWT. In addition, Dong Hoi is a dedicated port that is currently being built and is capable of receiving 30,000–50,000 DWT vessels.

Nghệ An's Vinh International Airport is the main airport of the North Central region and is the fifth most visited international airport in Vietnam. Currently, Vietnam Airlines, VietJet Air and Pacific Airlines operate an on average 26 flights per day. Vietnam Airlines operates four return flights: Vinh–Hanoi, Vinh–Ho Chi Minh City, Vinh–Da Nang and Vinh–Vientiane, Laos; VietJet Air operates Vinh–Ho Chi Minh City and Vinh–Da Lat; Pacific Airlines operates Vinh–Ho Chi Minh City and Vinh–Buon Ma Thuot.

Nghệ An has 94 km of the north–south railway. In particular, Ga Vinh is a first class station, and is the third largest passenger and cargo terminal in the country. In addition, there was the Cau Giat–Thai Hoa railway to the western mountainous districts of the province, although it has since been shut down.

With 419 km of land border with Laos (the longest country), Nghệ An has 4 border gates to Laos. Of which, 1 international gate of Nam Can (Ky Son) and 1 national border gate of Thanh Thuy (Thanh Chuong) has been planned as an international border gate and two additional border gates: Thong Thu (Que Phong) and Cao Ou (Anh Son) is a satellite and a hub for import and export activities in the North West, connecting the provinces from the North to the Central provinces of Vietnam with the provinces of Central, Northern Laos, Northeast of Thailand and Myanmar.

Economy
Nghệ An is one of the few localities where the Politburo issued a separate resolution on economic and social development, namely Resolution 26. Nghệ An is known as a province with great industrial potential in Vietnam, producing cement, sugar, milk, white stones ... leading the country.
The major industrial zones of the province are VSIP (15 km2), Hermaraj (30 km2), Nam Cam (4 km2) and Dong Hoi.

Tourism
 Cửa Lò beach is one of the most ideal beaches in Viet Nam with 10 km long sandy beach, fine sand, clean water, organized by the World Environment Organization and Vietnam National Administration of Tourism as one of the two clean and safe beaches in Vietnam. To the north, close to Cua Lo Lan Chau Island, wherein 1936, King Bao Dai built the resort castle. The southeastern town is Ngư Island, offshore is Mount Quynh Nhai 218m high compared to the sea with two islands connecting each other look like the eyes so folk called Island Eye or Hon Mat. Cua Lo is beautiful in the blue sky and beautiful with many memories of the cultural tradition of the Nghe.
 Pù Mát National Park is about 120 km south-west of Vinh City, Nghệ An province. This is a large forest area in North Central Vietnam and is also a biosphere reserve in the world. With beautiful natural landscape, Pu Mat is an attractive ecological tourist destination that attracts domestic and foreign tourists. Pu Mat National Park has an area of 194,000 ha of natural forest, of which the core area is 94,000 ha and the buffer zone is 100,000 ha. Pu Mat peak is 1,840 meters, covered with cloud cover. Pu Mat is one of the largest biological reserves in Vietnam with over 2,400 plant species, of which 37 species are listed in the Vietnam Red Book and 20 species in the Red List.
 Con Cuong: Model homestay tourism has been growing in Nghệ An. Nua hamlet, Yen Khe commune, Con Cuong district, Nghe An is a place where any citizen wants to experience homestay space in the people's home. Activities such as self-weaving of brocade towel, cooking traditional dishes or transforming into a Thai ethnicity will be very interesting. Here visitors can visit Pu Mat National Park, Khe Kem Waterfall or Khe Bu, Khe Thoi, which are all interesting places of the forest.
 Muong Thanh Ecological Park: Total area is 300ha, Muong Thanh Dien Lam ecological area (in Dong Nong hamlet, Dien Lam commune, Dien Chau) 60 km from Vinh city, 240 km from Hanoi capital. Along Highway 48, visitors will return to the ecology of Muong Thanh Dien Lam is quite convenient. This is a "long-term" project invested by Muong Thanh Hotel Group with the aim of making the place become the highlight of tourism, attracting many domestic and foreign tourists to Nghe An province. Started construction from 2014, up to now the ecological zone has opened the main items and welcome visitors to visit and relax. Coming to Muong Thanh ecological area, visitors will be able to visit the wildlife sanctuary with 60 animal species, including many rare species from Africa and South America such as white tigers, rhinoceros, antelopes and giraffes.
 Thanh Chuong Tea Island consists of dozens of small hills surrounded by Cau Cau dam that stretch across Thanh Thinh and Thanh An communes of Thanh Chuong district. The middle of the dam is the rolling hills that are grown by the tea planters like turtles that float on the water.

Education
There are six universities in Nghệ An, all of them are in Vinh city, the capital of Nghệ An province. The biggest one is Vinh University.

Ethnic groups
In addition to the majority Vietnamese people, the province is home to the Thổ people and Tai peoples such as the Red Tai, Tai Thanh and Tai Hang Tong. Some Ơ Đu people also live here.

References

External links
'''

 
North Central Coast
Gulf of Tonkin
Provinces of Vietnam